The primary highways of Ecuador are designated with both a name and an alphanumeric designation. The highway designations begin with the letter E followed by a number.

If the highway is a trunk highway (travelling north to south), the number is odd. They are numbered from smallest to largest from the west to the east.

If the highway is a transverse highway (travelling east to west), the number is even. They are numbered from smallest to largest from the north to the south.

Primary highways

Trunk highways

Transversal highways

Secondary highways

References